Blue Hill KF is a Swedish football club located in Solna.

Background
Blue Hill KF currently plays in Division 4 Stockholm Norra which is the sixth tier of Swedish football. They play their home matches at the Skytteholms IP in Solna.

The club is affiliated to Stockholms Fotbollförbund.

Season to season

Footnotes

External links
 Blue Hill KF – Official website
 Blue Hill KF on Facebook

Football clubs in Stockholm